Fromm is a surname. Notable people with the surname include:

 Eric Fromm (born 1958), American former tennis player
 Erich Fromm (1900–1980), German-American Jewish psychologist and humanistic philosopher
 Frieda Fromm-Reichmann (1889–1957), psychoanalyst and doctor; wife of Erich
 Friedrich Fromm (1888–1945), German army officer
 Jake Fromm (born 1998), American football player
 Julius Fromm (1883–1945), inventor of the seamless latex condom
 Paul Fromm (activist) (born 1949), Canadian fascist
 Paul Fromm (philanthropist) (1906–1987), American wine merchant and musical patron
 Pete Fromm (born 1958), American novelist

Variants 
 Martin Severin From, Danish chess master
 Allan Fromme, American psychologist
 Lynette Fromme, American attempted assassin
 Ethan Frome, a fictional character

See also 
 Mount Fromme, a mountain in British Columbia
 Frommel
 Fromm Verlag, an imprint of VDM Publishing
 Fromme
 Frum (Yiddish form)
 Frum (surname)

German-language surnames
Jewish surnames